This is a list of broadcast television stations that are licensed in the U.S. state of Massachusetts.

Full-power stations
VC refers to the station's PSIP virtual channel. RF refers to the station's physical RF channel.

Defunct full-power stations
Channel 5: WHDH-TV - ABC, CBS - Boston (11/26/1957-3/18/1972)
Channel 7: WNAC-TV - CBS, ABC - Boston (6/21/1948-5/22/1982)
Channel 14: WJZB-TV - NBC, ABC, DMT - Worcester (12/1953-1969)
Channel 19: WCDC-TV - CBS, ABC (satellite of WTEN) - Adams (2/5/1954-11/19/2017)
Channel 32: WRLP - NBC, Ind. - Greenfield (5/15/1957-4/9/1978)
Channel 56: WTAO-TV - DuMont/ABC - Boston (8/31/1953-3/30/1956)
Channel 56: WXHR-TV - experimental - Boston (5/17/1962-11/17/1962)

LPTV stations

Translators

Local Sports Television
NBC Sports Boston
New England Sports Network

Local News Television
New England Cable News

References 
 Free TV Report @ Boston City Hall (Zip Code 02201), NoCable.org

See also 
 List of wired multiple-system broadband providers in Massachusetts (by municipality)
 List of television stations in the United States by call sign (initial letter W)
 List of television stations in North America by media market
 List of United States over-the-air television networks
 Free-to-air#North America - Satellite
 List of radio stations in Massachusetts

Massachusetts
Television stations in Massachusetts
Television stations